Rashod Bateman (born November 29, 1999) is an American football wide receiver for the Baltimore Ravens of the National Football League (NFL). He played college football at Minnesota and was drafted by the Ravens in the first round of the 2021 NFL Draft.

Early years
Bateman grew up in Tifton, Georgia and attended Tift County High School. Bateman caught 56 passes for 825 yards and five touchdowns in his junior season and committed to play college football at the University of Minnesota the following summer upon receiving a scholarship offer from the school. As a senior, he was named first team All-State after catching 83 passes for 1,539 yards and 21 touchdowns. Bateman's productive senior season led to him receiving late recruiting interest from many top-level college programs, but he chose to stick to his commitment to Minnesota.

College career
As a true freshman at Minnesota, Bateman started at wide receiver and set freshman records for the Golden Gophers with 51 receptions, 704 receiving yards, and six touchdowns. As a sophomore, Bateman was named a semi-finalist for the Fred Biletnikoff Award and first team All-Big Ten with teammate Tyler Johnson (the first time teammates shared wide receiver honors) and the Richter–Howard Receiver of the Year after catching 57 passes for sophomore records of 1,170 yards (20.5 yards per catch, second all time to Johnson) and 11 touchdowns. Bateman was named a second team All-American by Sports Illustrated and USA Today and was a third team selection by the Associated Press.

On August 4, 2020, Bateman announced that he would forgo his 2020 season due to the Big Ten's decision to not play football during the COVID-19 pandemic. However, the Big Ten would later reverse their decision, with Bateman also rejoining the team for the shortened season.

College statistics

Professional career

Baltimore Ravens
Bateman was selected by the Baltimore Ravens with the 27th overall pick of the 2021 NFL Draft, making him the first Gopher to be drafted in the first round since Laurence Maroney in 2006. On May 12, 2021, Bateman signed with the Ravens on a $12.6 million contract that included a $6.5 million signing bonus.

2021 season
On September 1, 2021, Bateman was placed on injured reserve to start the season after undergoing groin surgery. On October 16, 2021, Bateman was activated to the active roster from injured reserve. In Week 14 Bateman recorded his first 100 yard game catching 7 passes for 103 yards in a 22–24 loss against the Cleveland Browns. In Week 16 against the Cincinnati Bengals, Bateman scored his first NFL touchdown on a 4-yard pass from Josh Johnson in the 41-21 loss.

2022 season
Bateman became a full-time starting wide receiver along with Devin Duvernay following the trade of Marquise Brown to the Arizona Cardinals during the offseason. In a Week 2 38–42 shootout loss to the Miami Dolphins, Bateman recorded 108 receiving yards on four catches, including one catch that he took 75 yards for a touchdown. The following week, in a 37–26 win over the New England Patriots, he had two catches for 59 yards, although he fumbled away the ball on the first catch. However, he also injured his foot during the game and missed the following two games. Bateman returned against the Tampa Bay Buccaneers, but left in the second quarter with a foot injury. On November 3, 2022, it was announced Bateman will undergo surgery on his foot, ending his season.

NFL career statistics

References

External links
Minnesota Golden Gophers bio

1999 births
Living people
People from Tifton, Georgia
Players of American football from Georgia (U.S. state)
African-American players of American football
American football wide receivers
Minnesota Golden Gophers football players
Baltimore Ravens players
21st-century African-American sportspeople